Viikate ("Scythe" in English) is a Finnish rock band from Kouvola, formed in 1996. The band is known for its melancholic lyrics, drawing inspiration from Finnish romance movies of the 1950s and Finnish singers of the era, including Reino Helismaa. Their style has been variously described as  "Helismaa-metal," "wire metal," and "death schlagers." The band began with Kaarle and Simeoni Viikate who remained the only members of the band until 2001, when Arvo and Ervo joined. The band's most well-known hits are Pohjoista viljaa (Northern Crops), Ei enkeleitä (No Angels) and Viina, Terva & Hauta (Booze, Tar & The Grave).

Kaarle and Simeoni got the idea of starting the band when watching Lyijykomppania's last concert.

Members 
 Kaarle Viikate (Kalle Virtanen) — vocals, guitar
 Simeoni Viikate (Simo Kairistola) — drums
 Arvo Viikate (Ari Taiminen) — guitar, vocals
 Ervo Viikate (Erkka Koskinen) — bass guitar, vocals

Discography

Albums 
 Noutajan valssi  (2000)
 Vuoden synkin juhla (2001)
 Kaajärven rannat (2002)
 Surut pois ja kukka rintaan (2003)
 Unholan urut (2005)
 Marraskuun lauluja I (2007)
 Marraskuun lauluja II (2007)
 Kuu kaakon yllä (2009)
 Petäjäveräjät (2012)
 Kymijoen lautturit (2013)
 Panosvyö (2014)
 XII – Kouvostomolli (2016)
 Kuu Kaakon Yllä 10 Vuotta (2019)
 Rillumarei! (2020)
Source:

EPs 
 Vaiennut soitto (transl. 'Silenced Playing') (1998)
 Roudasta Rospuuttoon (transl. 'From Frost to Rasputitsa') (1999)
 Alakulotettuja tunnelmia (transl. 'Depressified Feelings') (2000)
 Valkea ja kuulas (transl. 'White and Translucent') (2001)
 Kevyesti keskellä päivää (transl. 'Lightly Amidst the Day') (2002)
 Iltatähden rusko (transl. 'Afterglow of the Evening Star') (2003)
 Kuolleen miehen kupletti (transl. 'Dead Man's Couplet') (2004)
 Kesävainaja (transl. 'Summercorpse') (2009)
 Linna Espanjassa (transl. 'Castle in Spain') (2010)

Singles 
 Odotus (transl. 'The Wait')  (2001)
 Piinaava hiljaisuus (transl. 'The Agonizing Silence') (1997, 2002) (record / remastered)
 Ei ole ketään kelle soittaa (transl. 'There's No One to Call') (2002)
 Nuori mies nimetön (transl. 'A Nameless Young Man') (2002)
 Kaunis kotkan käsi (transl. 'The Beautiful Hand of the Eagle') (2003)
 Leimu (transl. 'Flame') (2003)
 Pohjoista viljaa (transl. 'Northern Crops') (2005)
 Tie (transl. 'The Road') (2005)
 Vesi jota pelkäät (transl. 'The Water You're Afraid Of') (2005)
 Ah, ahtaita aikoja (transl. 'Ah, Tight Times')(2006)
 Ei enkeleitä (transl. 'No Angels') (2007)
 Me olemme myöhäiset (transl. 'We Are the Late') (2007)
 Orret (transl. 'The Roosts') (2007)
 Viina, terva ja hauta (transl. 'Booze, Tar and the Grave') (2009)
 Kuu kaakon yllä (transl. 'The Moon Above South-East') (2009)
 Hautajaissydän (transl. 'The Funeral Heart') featuring Topi Sorsakoski (2010)
 Sysiässä (2012)
 Tervaskanto (2013)
 Panosvyö (2014)

References

External links 

 

Finnish heavy metal musical groups
Musical groups established in 1996
Musical quartets